Advanced Placement (AP) Environmental Science (also known as APES,  AP Enviro, AP Environmental, AP Environment, or AP EnviroSci) is a course and exam offered by the American College Board as part of the Advanced Placement Program to high school students interested in the environmental and natural sciences. AP Environmental Science was first offered in the 1997–1998 school year.

Course 
This course is designed to provide students with scientific principles, concepts, and methodologies necessary to comprehend the relationships abundant within the natural world, to identify and analyze environmental problems, to evaluate relative risks associated with these identified problems, and to examine alternative solutions for resolving and/or preventing similar problems facing the global environment.

Topics covered in AP Environmental Science as of Fall 2019 include:

Topics covered in AP Environmental Science prior to Fall 2019 include:

Exam
The AP Environmental Science exam is divided into a multiple choice and free response section.

Old exam (1998–2019) 
The old exam was 3 hours long and contained two sections:
Section I: Multiple Choice (100 questions, 90 minutes).
Section II: Free-Response (one data-set question, one document-based question, and two synthesis and evaluation questions, 90 minutes).

Current exam (2020–present) 
As of fall 2019, multiple changes have been made to the AP Environmental Science exam. These changes include but are not limited to: allowed calculator use, changes in the number of multiple choice questions, the use of stimuli in multiple choice questions, and changes in free response questions. 

According to the College Board: "The exam is 2 hours and 40 minutes long and includes 80 multiple-choice questions and 3 free-response questions. A four-function, scientific, or graphing calculator is allowed on both sections of the exam."
The new exam contains two sections with slight changes:
Section I: Multiple Choice (80 questions, 90 minutes).
Section II: Free-Response (one investigation design question, one solution to an environmental problem proposal question, and one solution to an environmental problem proposal question with calculations, 70 minutes).

Grade distribution
The percentage of students scoring a grade of "5" was only 6% in the 2021 testing administration. It remains one of the lowest "5" scoring AP Exams to this date right under AP Art History, AP English Literature & Composition, AP English Language & Composition, and AP World History. The AP Environmental Science exam was first administered in 1998.

Grade distributions since 2009 were:

References

External links
 AP Environmental Science at CollegeBoard.com
 AP Environmental Science Study Guide on Albert
 Environmental Science

Academic transfer
Environmental education
Advanced Placement